Andrew Savage is an American singer, songwriter, musician, and painter, best known for his work as co-frontman for the rock band Parquet Courts.

Andrew Savage may also refer to:

 Andrew Savage, contestant on Survivor (American TV series)